The Football League First Division was a division of the Football League in England from 1888 until 2004. It was the top division in the English football league system from the season 1888–89 until 1991–92, a century in which the First Division's winning club became English football champions.

The First Division contained between 12 and 24 clubs, playing each other home and away in a double round robin. The competition was based on two points for a win from 1888 until the increase to three points for a win in 1981.

After the creation of the Premier League, the name First Division was given to the second-tier division (from 1992). The name ceased to exist after the 2003–04 First Division season. The division was rebranded as the Football League Championship (now EFL Championship).

History

The Football League was founded in 1888 by Aston Villa director William McGregor. It originally consisted of a single division of 12 clubs (Accrington, Aston Villa, Blackburn Rovers, Bolton Wanderers, Burnley, Derby County, Everton, Notts County, Preston North End, Stoke (now Stoke City), West Bromwich Albion, and Wolverhampton Wanderers), known as The Football League. When the League admitted additional members from the rival Football Alliance in 1892, it was split into two divisions.

For the next 100 years, the First Division was the top professional league in English football. In 1992, the 22 clubs making up the First Division elected to resign from the Football League and set up the Premier League. The Football League was consequently re-organised, with the Second, Third, and Fourth Divisions renamed the First, Second, and Third respectively. Thus, the First Division, while still the top level of the Football League became the second level of the entire English football league system.

The First Division was renamed the Football League Championship prior to the start of the 2004–05 season, as part of a league-wide rebrand. The Football League rebranded itself as the English Football League prior to the 2016–17 season, with its top level becoming the EFL Championship at that time.

Liverpool were the most frequent winners of the First Division when it was the top flight of English football, winning it a total of 18 times.

Trophy and players' medals
The Football League First Division trophy was first awarded in 1891, and was presented to the winners through to 1992.

As of the 1947–48 season, making seven appearances for their club during the season was not enough for a player to qualify for a winners medal.

As of the 1975–76 season, players had to make 14 appearances for their club during the season in order to qualify for a winners medal.

First Division champions
The Football League First Division between 1888 and 1992 was the top tier in English football. 

From the start of the 1992-93 season, the first division became the second tier in English football. The champions would now be promoted to the Premier League. The 2003-04 season would be the last before rebranding as the Championship.

First Division all time top scorers

See also 

 List of English football first tier top scorers

References

 
1
Eng
Eng